The Roques de Anaga are two monolithic rocks forming some of the most emblematic natural monuments of Tenerife (Canary Islands, Spain). Roque de Tierra stands 179 meters above sea level and is closer to the main island while Roque de Fuera, at 66 meters above sea level, is farther away. Both rocks are also included in the European Union's Natura 2000 ecological network of protected areas. They are located off the north-east coast of Tenerife.

Natural history
Roques de Anaga is a part of the Anaga Rural Park and has been classified as a Special Protection Area for birds. The site has also been recognised as an Important Bird Area (IBA) by BirdLife International because the rocks support breeding populations of band-rumped storm petrels, little shearwaters and Bulwer's petrels.

References 

Gran Enciclopedia Virtual de las Islas Canarias
Roques de Anaga - Canary Islands Info

Geography of Tenerife
Rock formations of Spain
Volcanic plugs of the Canary Islands
Pliocene volcanoes
Archipelagoes of Spain
Important Bird Areas of the Canary Islands
Seabird colonies